Sir Edwin Thomas Smith  (6 April 1830 – 25 December 1919) was an English-born South Australian brewer, businessman, councillor, mayor, politician and philanthropist.

Early years
Smith was born on 6 April 1830 at Walsall, Staffordshire, England, the son of Edwin Smith. He was educated at Queen Mary's Grammar School, Walsall, and on leaving school had business experience with an uncle. By age 20, Smith was taking part in local politics.

Emigration
In 1853 Smith emigrated to South Australia aboard the California and began business as an importer of ironmongery at Adelaide, initially collaborating with his cousin James Alexander Holden. 
On 25 June 1857 he married Florence Stock, daughter of Robert Stock of Clifton, England. They would have two surviving children before she died in 1862.

Brewer
In 1860 he went into partnership with Edward Logue's brewery on King William Street, Kent Town. When Logue died in 1865, Smith continued the business as Kent Town Brewery. In 1876 he moved the business to the south-eastern corner of Dequetteville Terrace and Rundle Street. In 1888 he amalgamated his business with that of William Knox Simms to form the South Australian Brewing Company.

The malt towers of the old Kent Town Brewery have now been turned into luxury apartments overlooking the Adelaide Park Lands and Adelaide city centre.

Local government
Smith was Mayor of the Town of Kensington and Norwood during the years 1867–70 and 1871–73, and was afterwards elected to the Adelaide City Council. He served three terms as Mayor of Adelaide: in 1879–82, 1886–87 and 1887–88. It was as a result of his advocacy that Adelaide had its first tramways, King William Street was extended, and the Torrens Lake was formed.

Member of the House of Assembly
Smith entered parliament in 1871 as member for East Torrens in the South Australian House of Assembly, and except for a year while he was visiting England, continued to represent this constituency until he retired in 1893. Though an active member of parliament, he was not anxious for office, and only once was included in a government; he was Minister for Education in the Bray ministry from March to June 1884. 

He was, however, responsible for some useful legislation including a first offenders act, and he took a leading part in the promotion of the Adelaide Jubilee International Exhibition of 1887–88. For this and his other services to the colony, he was knighted in 1888. In 1894, he gave the city a bronze statue of Queen Victoria, which was placed in the geographic centre of Adelaide in the centre of Victoria Square.

Member of the Legislative Council
Smith was elected to the South Australian Legislative Council as member for Southern Districts in 1894 and remained a member until 1902. During the whole of his parliamentary experience he never lost an election.

Other roles, retirement and death
Smith was the founding president of the Kensington and Norwood Institute, and largely responsible for the funding of its building in 1876, now the heritage-listed Norwood Library on The Parade in Norwood.  

He was a regular churchgoer and for many years a deacon of Clayton Congregational Church, in Kensington.

Smith retired from the active conduct of his business in 1888, and retired from parliament in 1902. In retirement he took a great interest in a large number of institutions, to which he gave both time and money. He was chairman of the national park commissioners, and a trustee of the Savings Bank of South Australia. He was an active worker in the management of the Blind, Deaf and Dumb Institution; the  Adelaide Hospital; the Old Colonists' Association; the Elder workmen's homes; Adelaide Botanic Garden; and Adelaide Zoo.

Smith died of a cerebral haemorrhage on 25 December 1919 at his home, "The Acacias", in the eastern suburb of Marryatville.

Family
On 25 June 1857, Edwin Smith  married Florence Stock (c. 1837 – 12 February 1862), daughter of Robert Stock of Clifton, England. They had three children:
Horace Edwin Smith (1858–1858)
Florence Ida Smith (1859–1932), married George Henry Dean in 1882.
Sydney  Talbot Smith BA LLB (1861– 3 October 1948), married Florence Oliver Chettle (died died 21 September 1935), in 1887, with whom he had four children. 

Sir Edwin married again, in 1869, to Elizabeth Spicer (died 6 June 1911). This union was childless.

Legacies

Norwood Football Club
When the Norwood Football Club decided in December 2005 to set up a "Hall of Fame", Smith was appointed one of the 10 non-playing inaugural members. "Sir Edwin Thomas Smith was patron of Norwood from the club’s first day in 1878 until his last, Christmas Day 1919". "More than any other individual, Sir Edwin ensured that the club built its early sporting life on solid foundations".
He is known to have discovered a small 2 ounce of gold at Norwood oval in 1902. Edwin donated it to the football club, as well as his old pair of red socks. Ever since, Norwood has been known as the Redlegs.

Adelaide Oval
The Sir Edwin Smith Stand at the Adelaide Oval was named in his honour in 1922.  One of the roads leading up to the Oval is Sir Edwin Smith Way.

The Acacias
Smith bought the property on the corner of Portrush and Kensington Roads, known as The Acacias, in 1878 and made extensive additions and alterations to it. Upon his death in 1919, his home became Loreto Convent, then later Loreto College, Marryatville.

References

1830 births
1919 deaths
People from Walsall
Members of the South Australian House of Assembly
Members of the South Australian Legislative Council
Australian brewers
Mayors and Lord Mayors of Adelaide
People educated at Queen Mary's Grammar School
English emigrants to Australia
Australian Knights Commander of the Order of St Michael and St George
Australian politicians awarded knighthoods
19th-century Australian businesspeople